Guillermo de la Pena (born 24 February 1959) is a Spanish former professional racing cyclist.

Major results
Sources:
1981
 1st Stage 6b Vuelta Asturias
 9th Clásica de San Sebastián
1982
 1st Stage 6a Vuelta Asturias
 3rd Overall Vuelta a Cantabria
1984
 7th Subida a Arrate
1985
 1st Stage 1 Vuelta a los Valles Mineros
1986
 6th Subida a Arrate

Grand Tour general classification results timeline

References

External links
 

1959 births
Living people
Spanish male cyclists
Place of birth missing (living people)